The United States District Court for the District of Colorado (in case citations, D. Colo. or D. Col.) is a federal court in the Tenth Circuit (except for patent claims and claims against the U.S. government under the Tucker Act, which are appealed to the Federal Circuit).

The District was established on June 26, 1876, pending Colorado statehood on August 1, 1876.

, the United States Attorney for the District is Cole Finegan.

Organization of the court 

The United States District Court for the District of Colorado is the sole federal judicial district in Colorado. Court for the District is held at Colorado Springs, Denver, Durango, and Grand Junction.

Current judges 
:

Vacancies and pending nominations

Former judges

Chief judges

Succession of seats

See also 
 Courts of Colorado
 List of current United States district judges
 List of United States federal courthouses in Colorado

References

External links 
 United States District Court for the District of Colorado Official Website
 U.S. District Courts of Colorado, Legislative history, Federal Judicial Center
 United States Attorney for the District of Colorado Official Website

Colorado
Denver
1876 establishments in Colorado
Courts and tribunals established in 1876